Drockmill Hill Gut is a  long river in the Wealden District of East Sussex, England, that is a tributary to Glynleigh Sewer. It is partly located in the Pevensey Levels.

Course 
Drockmill Hill Gut rises in the civil parish of Willingdon and Jevington and precedes to flow a northeasterly course. After reaching Hankham in the civil parish of Westham, Drockmill Hill Gut flows northerly before flowing underneath Glynleigh Road via a culvert. It then resumes its northeasterly course, meandering several times, before finally flowing into Glynleigh Sewer.

References 

Rivers of East Sussex
Rivers of the Pevensey Levels